Spencer Harris House, also known as the William T. Harris Homeplace, is a historic home located near Falkland, Pitt County, North Carolina. It was built about 1855, and is a two-story, three-bay, double pile Greek Revival style frame dwelling.  It is sheathed in weatherboard siding, has a low hipped roof, and rests on a brick pier foundation.

It was listed on the National Register of Historic Places in 2005.

References

Houses on the National Register of Historic Places in North Carolina
Greek Revival houses in North Carolina
Houses completed in 1855
Houses in Pitt County, North Carolina
National Register of Historic Places in Pitt County, North Carolina